Rimdan-e Bankul (also Romanized as Rīmdān-e Bankūl; also known as Rīmdān-e Bangūl) is a village in Sand-e Mir Suiyan Rural District, Dashtiari District, Chabahar County, Sistan and Baluchestan Province, Iran. At the 2006 census, its population was 623, in 147 families.

References 

Populated places in Chabahar County